You Made Me Love You is a 1933 British comedy film directed by Monty Banks and starring Stanley Lupino, Thelma Todd and John Loder. The plot is a modern reworking of William Shakespeare's The Taming of the Shrew.

Cast
Stanley Lupino as Tom Daly
Thelma Todd as Pamela Berne
John Loder as Harry Berne
Gerald Rawlinson as Jerry
James Carew as Oliver Berne
Charles Mortimer as Mr Daly
Hugh E. Wright as Father
Charlotte Parry as Mother
Arthur Rigby as Brother
Syd Crossley as Bleak
Monty Banks as Taxi Driver

References

External links

1933 films
1930s English-language films
Films directed by Monty Banks
1933 comedy films
British comedy films
Films based on The Taming of the Shrew
British black-and-white films
Films shot at British International Pictures Studios
1930s British films